Shini Somara (born Shini Somarathne, on 30 July 1979) is a British mechanical engineer, media broadcaster, producer and author. She has presented TechKnow on Al Jazeera America and reporting for various BBC shows including The Health Show. She has also hosted two educational series of physics and engineering videos on the Crash Course YouTube channel for PBS Digital Studios. She has been a presenter on BBC America, Sky Atlantic, BBC1, BBC2, and PBS.

Early life and education 
Somara is the eldest of three daughters born to a Sri Lanka-born mechanical engineer and his wife (both studied at South Bank University, formerly Borough Polytechnic Institute). Somara's father runs a mechanical engineering consultancy for building services.

Born and raised in London, Somara studied at Henrietta Barnett School,
and began her mechanical engineering career at Brunel University London, completing a Bachelors of Engineering before moving on to an engineering doctorate (EngD), which she was awarded in 2003 for her doctoral thesis, Dynamic Thermal Modelling Using CFD. Her specialisation was in computational fluid dynamics, where computer simulations are used to visualise phenomena invisible to the naked eye, helping engineers to understand how fluids flow.

Somara has a published paper in the International Journal of Ventilation titled "Transient Solution Methods for Dynamic Thermal Modelling within CFD".

Career

Media
Somara's broadcasting career started in 2011 when she presented on the BBC's The Health Show, covering developments in global health. Later the same year, she began hosting No Kitchen Required which aired in 2012 on BBC America. The show involved three professional chefs immersing themselves in alternative culture with tribes and attempting to cook using unfamiliar tribal methods. The first season included trips to Dominica, New Zealand, Thailand and Fiji.

In 2013, Somara started working on the Al Jazeera America talk show TechKnow - a 30-minute show about science and technology. It outlines innovations in technology and science and how they are changing lives of people in America. The shows are recorded with a group of contributors with backgrounds in science and technology.

Between 2014 and late 2016, Somara worked on several BBC productions, including Tomorrow's Food, Battle of Jutland and Secrets of Orkney with Neil Oliver and Chris Packham, and for Sky Atlantic.

In early 2016, she also started working with PBS Digital Studios on Crash Course Physics (an online educational resource explaining complicated theories in a simple way with intuitive visuals). She extended her involvement with Crash Course in 2018 with a new series, Crash Course Engineering.

In 2020, Somara was a reporter on scientific programme Razor on CGTN. In January 2021, Somara was a regular commentator on Science Channel's Engineering Catastrophes.

STEM and other work

Somara made a speech to the United Nations on 10 February 2017 about women and girls in STEM (science, technology, engineering, and mathematics).

On International Women in Engineering Day, June 2018, Somara launched her first podcast called "Scilence", to provide a platform for women to speak anonymously about their experiences in STEM and what it is like to work in an industry dominated by males. "Scilence" later evolved into "Innervation", another podcast which tackles common issues holding many women back from reaching their fullest potential.

Somara is a mentor at Imperial College London and is on the E&T Innovation Awards advisory board of the Institution of Engineering and Technology.

She has also written an engineering book for younger readers called An Engineer Like Me, the first in a series of four books (including A Scientist Like Me,  A Coder Like Me and A Mathematician Like Me).

References 

British mechanical engineers
BBC newsreaders and journalists
Living people
Alumni of Brunel University London
1978 births
British people of Sri Lankan descent